The Tennessee Army National Guard is a component of the United States Army and the United States National Guard. Nationwide, the Army National Guard comprises approximately one half of the US Army's available combat forces and approximately one third of its support organization. National coordination of various state National Guard units are maintained through the National Guard Bureau.

Tennessee Army National Guard units are trained and equipped as part of the United States Army. The same ranks and insignia are used and National Guardsmen are eligible to receive all United States military awards. The Tennessee Guard also bestows a number of state awards for local services rendered in or to the state of Tennessee.

Current units

Current units include the following:
 230th Sustainment Brigade
 194th Engineer Brigade
 30th Troop Command - moved from Smyrna to Tullahoma in 2004
 1st Squadron, 230th Cavalry Regiment
 1st Battalion, 181st Field Artillery Regiment
 230th Liaison Team
 TN Medical Command
 25th Operational Support Airlift Detachment
1st Battalion (Airfield Operations), 107th Aviation Regiment
 117th Regiment Training Institute:
 1-117th Military Police
 2-117th Armor
 3-117th Quartermaster
 Officer Candidate School (OCS)

278th Armored Cavalry Regiment (ACR)

 278th ACR
 Headquarters 278th Armored Cavalry Regiment at Knoxville
 Detachment 1 Battery A Regimental Fires Squadron 278th ACR at Pigeon Forge
 Headquarters and Headquarters Troop RTS, 278th ACR at Lebanon
 A Troop RTS, 278th ACR at Nashville
 C Troop RTS, 278th ACR at Dunlap
 Detachment 1, C Troop RTS, 278th ACR at Monteagle
 Detachment 2, C Troop RTS, 278th ACR at McKenzie
 B Battery Field Artillery Squadron, 278th ACR at Covington
 Regimental Support Squadron Headquarters, 278th ACR at Columbia
 Detachment 1, Troop F Support Squadron, 278th ACR at Parsons
 Headquarters and Headquarters Troop, 1/278th ACR Henderson
 Troop A 1/278th ACR at Huntingdon
 Troop B 1/278th ACR at Clarksville
 Troop C 1/278th ACR at Milan
 Troop D 1/278th ACR at Ashland City
 Headquarters and Headquarters Troop, 2/278th ACR at Cookeville
 Detachment 1, HHT, 2-278th ACR at Gallatin
 Troop E, 2/278th ACR at Jamestown
 Detachment 1, Troop E, 2/278th ACR at Livingston
 Troop F, 2/278th ACR at McMinnville
 Troop G, 2/278th ACR at Crossville
 Troop H, 2/278th ACR at Rockwood
 Headquarters and Headquarters Troop, 3/278th ACR at Mount Carmel
 Troop K, 3/278th ACR AT Newport
 Troop L, 3/278th ACR at Greeneville

181st Field Artillery Regiment
 181st Field Artillery Regiment
 Detachment 1 at Dayton
 Battery A at Lawrenceberg
 Battery B at Pulaski
 Detachment 1, Battery B at Fayetteville

Military Police
 117th Military Police Battalion at Athens
 Headquarters and Headquarters Detachment, 168th Military Police Battalion at Dyersburg
 251st Military Police Company at Lexington
 Detachment 1, 251st Military Police Company (CS) at Bolivar
 252nd Military Police Company at Cleveland
 Detachment 1, 252nd Military Police Company at Oneida
 253rd Military Police Company (CS) at Lenoir city
 Detachment 1, 253rd Military Police Company (CS) at Bristol
 268th Military Police Company at Ripley
 Detachment 1, 268th Military Police Company at Alamo
 269th Military Police Company at Murfreesboro

473rd Brigade Support Battalion
 473rd Brigade Support Battalion
 Company A at Lobelville
 Detachment 1, Company A at New Tazewell
 Detachment 1, Company E (FSC AR) at Gordonsville
 Company G, at Lewisburg

Engineering Units
 Headquarters and Headquarters Company, 194th Engineer Brigade at Jackson
 Detachment 1, 190th Engineer Company, 230th Engineer Brigade at Jefferson City
 212th Engineer Company at Paris
 Detachment 1, 212th Engineer Company at Camden

Maintenance Units
 776th Maintenance Company at Elizabethon
 Detachment 1, 776th Maintenance Company at Mountain City
 771st Maintenance Company at Centerville
 Detachment 1, 771st Maintenance Company at Hohenwald

Transportation Units
 Detachment 1, 1176th Transportation Company at Jacksboro
 Detachment 1, 1175th Transportation Company (Het) at Brownsville

Other
 155th Signal Company at Memphis
 Battery A, 3rd Battalion, 115th Field Artillery Regiment at Maryville
 Detachment 1, Headquarters and Headquarters Troop, 1st Squadron, 230th Cavalry Regiment at Louisville
 Troop A, 1st Squadron, 230th Cavalry Regiment at Jackson
 Company B, Special Troops Battalion (SIG) at Knoxville
 Detachment 1, 730th Quartermaster Company at Erwin
 176th Combat Sustainment Support Battalion at Johnson City
 30th Combat Sustainment Support Battalion at Humbolt
 Recruiting and Retention Battalion at Smyrna
 129th Army Band at Nashville
 Company E, 278th Brigade Support Battalion at Lafayette
 Troop D, 278th Brigade Support Battalion at Clinton

History

Tennessee's 45th General Assembly in 1887 established the Tennessee National Guard, as it is known today. State lawmakers set up the basic conditions under which the force would operate. Tennessee was among the first states to offer her full quota of soldiers for the Spanish–American War. The equipped Tennessee Guard units were mobilized. Four regiments were created, but only the 1st and 4th Regiments deployed overseas. In World War I, the 30th Infantry Division was deployed overseas. Tennessee personnel made up the 117th Infantry Regiment, the 114th and 115th Field Artillery, and the 114th Machine Gun Battalion.

After World War One, platoons of the Tennessee National Guard participated in the Knoxville riot of 1919.

When the 30th Infantry Division reorganized on 11 September 1947 it was composed of Guard units from North Carolina and Tennessee. In 1954 it was reorganized as a North‑South Carolina division with the Tennessee portion reorganized and redesignated as the 30th Armored Division. The 30th Armored Division was inactivated on 1 December 1973, with its lineage carried by the 30th Armored Brigade and the 30th Support Group, TN ARNG.

The 194th Engineer Brigade was activated as an entity of the Tennessee Army National Guard on 1 November 1973. This occurred as a result of the major reorganization of the Tennessee ARNG which inactivated the 30th Armored Division. The numerical designation was derived from a former engineer unit of the Tennessee Army National Guard, the 194th Engineer Battalion, headquartered in Centerville, Tennessee.

More than 3,600 Tennessee Guardsmen responded to Operations Desert Shield and Desert Storm. The 196th Field Artillery Brigade (including the 1st Battalion, 181st Field Artillery) was one of only two Army Guard combat units to see actual combat. The Tennessee Army deployed 17 units during the conflict. A few days prior to G-Day, Tennessee's 212th Engineer Company, attached to the 101st Airborne Division (Air Assault), broke through the border berm into enemy territory, building a six-lane road. The unit traversed six miles before the ground war began, becoming the first unit of the 101st into Iraq and one of the first U.S. units to breach the Iraqi defensive zones.

The 30th Armored Brigade (Separate) furled its colors in Jackson, Tennessee in the early 1990s. The colors were passed to the 230th Area Support Group in Dyersburg, TN. The 230th has been inactivated since its return from Camp Arifjan, Kuwait.

Historic units

See also
Tennessee Air National Guard
Tennessee State Guard
Tennessee Military Department

References

 Historical register and dictionary of the United States Army, from ..., Volume 1 By Francis Bernard Heitman 
 Encyclopedia of United States Army insignia and uniforms By William K. Emerson (page 51).

External links

 US Army Lineage And Honors Information
Bibliography of Tennessee Army National Guard History compiled by the United States Army Center of Military History
 Tennessee Military Department Official Site

Military in Tennessee
State agencies of Tennessee
United States Army National Guard by state